Bickett is a surname. Notable people with the surname include:

Duane Bickett (born 1962), American football player
Thomas Walter Bickett (1869–1921), American politician

See also
Beckett